Michael A. Simon (born December 17, 1960) is an American television and film director, writer, and producer best known for his work on VH1 Storytellers, New Visions, and Ridiculousness.

Career

Michael A. Simon was born to an American Jewish family. He ran the campus radio station (WRGW; a classic college punk/alternative station) as a college student at George Washington University, which was his introduction into the entertainment field.  Upon graduating Simon headed to TV News, and landed a job with ABC News in their DC bureau. Simon worked at ABC News during that election year of and also worked for ABC Sports including Monday Night Football. 

After ABC, Simon moved back to his hometown of NYC and worked in a variety of positions in the Production Assistant world and at NBC Sports on NFL coverage. The next change would be pivotal in Simon’s career as he got a job with VH1 in its early days. From his position inside VH1 Simon would first Produce and Direct the award-winning music series New Visions. New Visions featured a vast variety of musicians in-studio performances and interviews across five genres;  Jazz, Rock, Folk, WorldBeat, and Soul. Some of the artists who appeared in the four-year run were: Miles Davis, Dizzy Gillespie, Joan Baez, Chris Issac, Sinead O'Connor, Lou Reed, Joe Cocker.

Continuing at VH1 for a full decade Simon moved into Directing major live music specials and award shows. He created, wrote, produced and directed the iconic VH1 Storytellers which featured artists telling intimate stories and then performing them before a small audience, originally shot on Film Simon the first 53 episodes, from Johnny Cash to David Bowie, to Elton John to Garth Brooks. 

Simon left VH1 in 1998 and has worked on over 25 series and specials including; 22 Live Survivor Finales, A Home for the Holidays, America’s Best Dance Crew, The Sing-Off and the worldwide sensation Ridiculousness which is now at 400+ episodes. He has continued his work,  directing programs primarily in music and dance, including broadcast concerts and Reality TV competitions, such as The Sing-Off, Dance your Ass Off, and Randy Jackson Presents America’s Best Dance Crew.

In 2000, he established Give and Go, Inc., a entertainment production company where he currently is developing multiple feature films, documentary series, and animations. He is a multiple EMMY award nominated/winning director, as well as a recipient of multiple ACE awards. He is a long time member of the Directors Guild of America, the Negotiating Committee of the DGA and the Academy of Television Arts and Sciences.

Currently Simon is set to make his feature directorial debut in an adaptation of the 1979 documentary “Town Bloody Hall:” Town Bloody Hall is the story of author’s Norman Mailer’s battle with the Women’s Liberation, and his obsession with Marilyn Monroe counterpointed against a modern #metoo story of a single father and his 20-year-old daughter.  And is currently in pre-production with his first feature film, That Will Be The Day, about a former child star who, upon release from prison, returns to his unconventional acting teacher who transforms him into Buddy Holly in hopes that he can win the role of Buddy on Broadway and bring his career back to life.

Personal life
Michael was born in NYC and raised in Great Neck, NY. He attended George Washington University in Washington D.C. He currently resides in Los Angeles with his wife Debra.

Awards and nominations
EMMYs
 Nomination for Live Survivor Finale: “Best Non-Fiction”
 Award for Special Class Program: “A Home for the Holidays”
& Nomination for Best Daytime Game/Quiz Show: American Bible Challenge

ACE Awards
 Award for Best Music Series:  “New Visions”
 Award for Best Music Series “VH1 to One”
 Nominations for "Center Stage", "Four on the Floor", "VH1 Presents", "VH1 Storytellers", "My Generation", "New Visions" (4), "Brian Eno Special"

References

External links
 
  MichaelASimon.com

Television producers from New York City
Living people
1960 births
Businesspeople from New York City
George Washington University alumni